Caenoplana is a genus of land planarians from Australia and New Zealand.

Description 
The genus Caenoplana is characterized by having an elongate, cylindrical to sub-cylindrical body. The eyes are arranged along the body margins, crowded irregularly at the sides of the anterior end and extending in a single row to the posterior end. The copulatory apparatus lacks a permanent penis, i. e., the penis is formed during copulation by folds in the male cavity. The female cavity is irregular and narrow and the ovovitelline ducts join each other behind it, entering it ventrally.

Species 
The following species are recognised in the genus Caenoplana:
Caenoplana albolineata 
Caenoplana barringtonensis 
Caenoplana citrina 
Caenoplana coerulea 
Caenoplana daemeli 
Caenoplana decolorata Mateos, Jones, Riutort, & Álvarez-Presas, 2020
Caenoplana dubia 
Caenoplana graffi 
Caenoplana hillii 
Caenoplana hoggii 
Caenoplana micholitzi 
Caenoplana munda 
Caenoplana ponderosa 
Caenoplana purpurea 
Caenoplana sieboldi 
Caenoplana spenceri 
Caenoplana steenstrupi 
Caenoplana steinboecki 
Caenoplana sulphurea 
Caenoplana tenuis 
Caenoplana variegata 
Caenoplana viridis

References 

Geoplanidae
Rhabditophora genera